Charles Edward Baring Young (19 March 1850 – 22 September 1928) was an English educationalist and Conservative politician.

Young was born at Paddington, the son of Charles Baring Young and his wife Elizabeth Winthrop. He was educated at Eton and Trinity College, Cambridge. He was later called to the bar at Inner Temple. On the death of his father in 1882, he inherited an estate at Monkenfrith, East Barnet.

Young had strong Christian principles and was inspired to help underprivileged and orphan children from London. In September 1883, he purchased the Daylesford and Kingham Hill estates in Oxfordshire in order to establish Kingham Hill School for boys. Many years after it became a mixed school. The estates comprised  between the River Evenlode in Oddington, Oxfordshire and Churchill, Oxfordshire.

Young was elected Member of Parliament (MP) for Christchurch, Hampshire in November 1885. He held the seat until 1892 when he resigned to concentrate his efforts on Kingham Hill School. Young also purchased a farm at Woodstock, Ontario where he provided an opportunity for many of his Kingham Hill boys to find a life in Canada. On his death in 1928 his Monkenfrith estate was donated for the foundation of Oak Hill College.

References

Sources

External links 
 

1850 births
1928 deaths
Conservative Party (UK) MPs for English constituencies
UK MPs 1885–1886
UK MPs 1886–1892
Alumni of Trinity College, Cambridge
Members of the Inner Temple
People educated at Eton College
English barristers